Võ Văn Bảy (18 July 1931 – 24 November 1998) was a Vietnamese tennis player.

Born in Vĩnh Long, Võ was a table tennis player in his youth and took up tennis after he moved to Saigon. He was South Vietnam's leading player from the mid-1950s through to the 1970s.

Võ won the Malaysian Championships in 1969.

A two-time Asian Games medalist in doubles, Võ won regular medals for South Vietnam at the Southeast Asian Games, including a singles gold in 1961. He won six Southeast Asian Games men's doubles gold medals.

Võ competed for the South Vietnam Davis Cup team from 1964 to 1974, featuring in 14 ties. Most famously he won a Davis Cup rubber over the Japanese number one Toshiro Sakai at Saigon in 1972. He was 40 years of age at that time and also defeated Jun Kamiwazumi in the reverse singles.

References

External links
 
 
 

1931 births
1998 deaths
Vietnamese male tennis players
People from Vĩnh Long province
Asian Games medalists in tennis
Asian Games silver medalists for Vietnam
Asian Games bronze medalists for Vietnam
Medalists at the 1958 Asian Games
Medalists at the 1966 Asian Games
Tennis players at the 1958 Asian Games
Tennis players at the 1966 Asian Games
Southeast Asian Games medalists in tennis
Southeast Asian Games gold medalists for Vietnam
Competitors at the 1961 Southeast Asian Peninsular Games